École L'Odyssée (English: "Odyssey School") is a public francophone high school in Moncton, New Brunswick, Canada. It is part of the province's Francophone Sud School District, offering education to students from grade nine to twelve. The school opened on September 30, 2005 as part of a $24.2 million project, alongside the adjoining middle school, École Le Mascaret. École L'Odyssée was conceived as a way to alleviate the overcrowding problem at École Mathieu-Martin in nearby Dieppe, a problem the district has had in the past. The Odyssée-Mascaret project, as well as the future Carrefour de l'Acadie middle school, replaced the former École Beauséjour and École Vanier complexes. This move allowed the Moncton Hospital to expand, while the Vanier establishment made way for medical offices. On September 9, 2009, the school was given permission to begin an $884,000 expansion for its far side, allowing for a larger space to be reserved for its infirmary and orientation center.

As of September 2010, the school holds 767 students out of its capacity of 850, compared to 971 students at École Mathieu-Martin. It is the only French high school in Moncton.

History
As Moncton's population grew over the years, overcrowding in high schools soon became a problem: in the 2004–05 school year, École Mathieu-Martin – the sole francophone high school in the area – had an enrolment of 1,609 students, well above the 2009–2010 enrolment of 1,025. When the city's growth rate climbed from 5% in the years 1991–96 to 6.5% in the years 2001–06, the problem became even more apparent. In fact, prior to construction, the idea of a second francophone complex had been in the minds of the New Brunswick Department of Education since as early as December 20, 2002. This idea was later confirmed in New Brunswick's record-breaking $809 million budget for the 2003–04 fiscal year, where $100,000 was allocated to "develop the educational specifications" of the complex. Originally, the project was code named "Moncton School Complex".

On January 12, 2004, the two schools were revealed to be attached side-to-side, occupying a combined area of 16,000 square meters ( square feet) about 2.5 kilometres ( miles) from the nearby Université de Moncton. When commenting on the new facility, New Brunswick Premier Bernard Lord said that "[this] project offers numerous advantages, from several points of view", and that "it reflects [the government's] commitment to equipping New Brunswick with a high-calibre education system." The names for the two schools were picked from submissions sent by the education councils of District 01 and District 03 on March 14, 2005. Both schools were announced to be replacing École Beauséjour and École Vanier, two francophone middle schools, which made way for the expansion of the Moncton Hospital and for medical offices, respectively.

A final $11.2 million was allocated on January 6, 2005, which was 23.3% of the $48 million Department of Education budget for that fiscal year. On July 15, 2005, the school was awarded a $60,000 federal fund for energy efficiency 39% below the national energy threshold; this would save the New Brunswick government $115,193 per year, or an eventual $2 million over 20 years. The province's educational minister, Madelaine Dubé, said: "It is good to know that our schools can also contribute to protecting our environment." The school held its inauguration ceremony with Bernard Lord present on September 30, 2005, despite its delayed opening a few days after the beginning of the 2005–06 school year. Lord spoke of his government's intention to add schools to the growing number of Francophone institutions in New Brunswick, as well as advancing the state of the province's education. "Today's inauguration represents an historic moment for Moncton's Francophone community," he said in his speech. "Parents, students and teaching staff now have modern, state of the art facilities. I feel very proud about this project and I am delighted that it is now a reality."

The city went under scrutiny after the death on November 30 of Erica Frenette, a student at L'Odyssée, who was struck by a car after crossing an intersection near the school in poor weather conditions. Parents began petitions to install street lights near what they deemed to be a "dangerous [street corner]", and on May 4, the request was approved.

Academics

Curriculum
The school's curriculum is based on a 30-credit system, requiring a student to receive all 17 mandatory credits and seven optional credits to graduate. Examples of notable courses are law, Esperanto, German, Auto mechanics, carpentry, entrepreneurship, world religions, cooperative education, and leadership. L'Odyssée also offers exclusive courses in work-life development and speaking Acadian.

A partnership with the Université de Moncton and CCNB Dieppe allows students to take and be credited for select courses off-campus one period per semester at no cost during their senior year. Additionally, Cisco offers a course in server and information sustainment, and the school offers access to ten online courses, including astronomy and world geography.  Sports programs are available and credited, including hockey and soccer.

There are two curricular programs, called "Volets", for students wishing to graduate with honours in science and engineering or art and social sciences. The main differences between the standard curriculum and the two "Volet" programs are the addition of mandatory courses in the domain of the chosen program, and the requirement to complete thirty hours of volunteer duty. A student must gain an average of 80% in the additional mandatory courses to graduate with honours.

Schedule

École L'Odyssée operates on a modified version of the controversial concept of block scheduling. Instead of the traditional seven- or eight-period school day,  every day students attend four out of the five classes for that semester. The following semester, students attend their remaining five courses in the same fashion, totalling ten courses per year. School days are labelled 1 to 5, instead of Monday to Friday, with each "day" having a predetermined layout. This type of scheduling prevents courses being cancelled for holidays and school vacations, since in such a case, the schedule resumes with the days shifted forward by the length of the school break. For example, if Monday was designated as Day 1, and Tuesday was a holiday, Wednesday would be Day 2, and Thursday would be Day 3. This type of scheduling, however, does not cover unexpected school cancellations (for example, school closure due to poor weather), due to problems it would cause with the predetermined calendar.

Wednesdays, regardless of the "day", are cut by one hour throughout the district to compensate for Community of Practice (French: , or "CAP") meetings between teachers at the end of the day, to "direct [the district's efforts] towards the educational success of students." Study hall (known as the "PAAQ" period, which stands for "") is reserved between the first and second period of the day, except for Wednesdays, where the period is removed to compensate for the CAP meetings.

Another difference between L'Odyssée and other schools is the amount of time allotted between classes. Instead of the usual five-minute intermission, students are given 14 minutes between every period – except for the intermission between the first period and PAAQ, and between lunch and the third period, where students are given five minutes. They receive 57 minutes for their lunch every day, except for Wednesdays, when they get a 55-minute lunch (both excluding the five-minute intermission).

Although the schedule is identical throughout the school, students must fill in their courses – A through E – as defined by their schedule:

Rankings
Outside rankings for the school have been low compared to the district's average. In 2010, a report published by the Atlantic Institute for Market Studies put L'Odyssée at the bottom of the district's 22-school list overall (one school being unranked), based on data from 2005 to 2008.

In 2005, the province began including the school in their reports on student dropout rates. At the time, its rates were the highest in the province, with a total of six dropouts for every 100 students enrolled. In contrast, the district average was 0.9 dropouts per 100 enrolments, and the provincial average was 2.4 dropouts. The following year, the school's rate dropped to 5.4, remaining three percentage points above the provincial average. In 2007, it fell 2.2 points, down to 3.2 dropouts per 100 students, and finally settled at 2%, 0.2 percentage points below the provincial average of 2.2%.

In terms of academic performance, the province releases report cards based on yearly exams to track the progress toward a goal set for 2013. The exams are held for English classes in the tenth grade, for French classes in the eleventh grade, and for mathematics in the eleventh grade. The report card rates schools based on how many students pass each exam, instead of rating on the average mark on the exam. L'Odyssée, according to the report, is below both the district and the provincial success rate:

Athletics
L'Odyssée offers spots in nearly every NBIAA-organized sport. Players participating under the school's name are given the nickname "" (English: Olympian).

Hockey
The hockey teams, male and female, are required to practice every first period of the first semester in a credited course. Students participate in up to three tournaments before the provincials and over 30 games in total. The 2009–10 female team finished second in the provincial finals versus the Riverview Blackhawks.

Soccer

The school has four soccer teams: two juniors and two seniors. The male junior team placed first in the 2009 provincial championships.

Track and field
The track and field team at L'Odyssée has been the recipient of several provincial titles since 2006. Team members have included Geneviève Lalonde (7-time champion with six provincial records in the 800 m, 1,500 m, and 3,000 m from 2006 to 2009 and represented Canada at the 2010 World Junior Championships in Athletics), Jessica Chamberland (6-time champion with one provincial record in the shot put from 2006 to 2009), and Alexandre Coholan (2-time champion in the 100 m and 200 m, as well as a silver medal in the triple jump).

 Asterisk (*) denotes NBIAA record holding score as of 2012.

Other sports
L'Odyssée is home to a cross-country team, a softball and baseball team, two Basketball teams, a golf team, a football team, a swimming team, three curling teams, a badminton team, and a rugby union team. In 2010, the school's wrestling team featured a provincial winner in the girls' 60 kg class. The senior female volleyball team took the silver medal in the 2010 provincial tournament.

Activities

Jazz / Harmony
The Jazz and Harmony teams, led by instructor Martin McLaughlin (previously Charles Arsenau), act as a side project for the school's existing music course and has participated in every yearly Heritage Festival since 2005. The team won a competition in New York in 2009 and six Maestro awards, including the "Outstanding Band Award", and "Best Solo". The following year, the team placed second and garnered one Maestro award in Washington.

Improvisation
L'Odyssée participated in the regional Improvisation competitions in the 2009–10 season. The team also participated in the "" competition, a provincial tournament, and took first place. Sebastien Richard earned the "Most Starred Player" award, while captain Julie Frigault won MVP.

Debate club
The school was among the first to participate in the debut of the provincial debate championship in Caraquet. The team of three received the gold prize on March 22, 2010 against École Mathieu-Martin in the finals.

See also
 École Le Mascaret
 École Mathieu-Martin
 Francophone Sud School District
 List of schools in New Brunswick

Notes

References

External links

  
 Info from District 1 

High schools in Moncton
Educational institutions established in 2005
2005 establishments in New Brunswick